The Jingliao Huang Family Mansion is a historical house in Houbi District, Tainan, Taiwan.

History
The house was built in 1928.

Architecture
The facade of the house is a renaissance style and the house building is a Southern Min style. It is a symmetric structure with five paneled facades. The front side has two columns and a terrazzo fire wall. Both sides of the halls are octagon shape and the side wings are protected with fire walls. The back side is fenced and the back wing is protected with fire wall.

See also
 List of tourist attractions in Taiwan

References

1928 establishments in Taiwan
Buildings and structures in Tainan
Houses in Taiwan
Residential buildings completed in 1928
Tourist attractions in Tainan